Ruda Bugaj  is a village in the administrative district of Gmina Aleksandrów Łódzki, within Zgierz County, Łódź Voivodeship, in central Poland.

The village has a population of 260.

References

Ruda Bugaj